Michael Patrick O'Connor (September 29, 1831 – April 26, 1881) was a U.S. Representative from South Carolina.

Early life
Born in Beaufort, South Carolina, O'Connor attended the public schools and was graduated from St. John's College, Fordham, New York, in 1850. He studied law, was admitted to the bar in 1854 and commenced practice in Charleston, South Carolina. During the Civil War, he served in the Confederate military as a lieutenant in the Lafayette Light Artillery.

Political career

He served as member of the South Carolina House of Representatives 1858–1866. He served as delegate to the Democratic National Conventions in 1872 and 1876. He argued against secession in the state house of representatives.

He was an unsuccessful candidate for election in 1874 to the Forty-fourth and in 1876 to the Forty-fifth Congresses, but was elected as a Democrat to the Forty-sixth Congress (March 4, 1879 – March 3, 1881). He received credentials as a Member-elect to the Forty-seventh Congress, but died, pending a contest by Edmund W.M. Mackey (which subsequently resulted successfully for the contestant), in Charleston, South Carolina, April 26, 1881. He was interred in St. Lawrence Cemetery.

See also
List of United States Congress members who died in office (1790–1899)

References

Sources

Books

External sources

External links
 

1831 births
1881 deaths
Confederate States Army officers
Democratic Party members of the United States House of Representatives from South Carolina
19th-century American politicians
People of South Carolina in the American Civil War